Starvation is a severe deficiency in caloric energy intake, below the level needed to maintain an organism's life.  It may also refer to:

Places
 Starvation Creek State Park, a state park located west of Hood River, Oregon in the Columbia River Gorge
 Starvation Flats, an area in the San Bernardino Mountains near Big Bear Lake, California
 Starvation Lake, a small recreational and fishing lake in Kalkaska County, Michigan
 Starvation State Park, a state park in northeastern Utah, United States

Songs
 "Starvation", by the Jamaican reggae vocal trio The Pioneers
 "Starvation/Tam Tam Pour L'Ethiopie", a double A-sided charity single released in 1985

Other
 Starvation (computer science), a problem encountered in concurrent computing where a process is perpetually denied necessary resources to process its work
 Starvation (glaciology), when a glacier retreats, not because of temperature increases, but due to low precipitation
 "Starvation" (Justified), an episode of the TV series Justified
 Very-low-calorie diet (also starvation diet), a diet with very or extremely low daily food energy consumption